My Seal and Them (French: Mon phoque et elles) is a 1951 French comedy film directed by Pierre Billon and starring Marie Daëms, François Périer and Jeanne Fusier-Gir. A separate Swedish-language version My Friend Oscar was also produced.

It was shot at the Photosonor Studios in Courbevoie on the outskirts of Paris. The film's sets were designed by the art director René Moulaert.

Synopsis
A fast-living diplomat's uncomplicated life is thrown into disorder when he wins a seal in a raffle. His girlfriend Gabrielle leaves him, but fortunately he meets Diana an Englishwoman who appreciates seals.

Cast
 Marie Daëms as Gabrielle Rivers
 François Périer as François Verville
 Jeanne Fusier-Gir as Madame Pierrat
 Pierre Bertin as Monsieur de Saint-Brive
 Moira Lister as Diana
 Odette Barencey as La concierge
 Made Siamé as La poissonnière
 Jacques Dynam as Un livreur
 Hennery as Un livreur
 Raymond Rognoni as Le gérant
 Pierre Sergeol as Le patron du restaurant 
 Campbell Cotts as Sir Archibald
 Michael Trubshawe as Sir Frederick
 René Alié as Un agent de police 
 Gil Delamare as Un agent
 Marcel Melrac as L'employé à la gare
 Albert Michel as Le poissonnier
 Jean Kolb as Le locataire
 Georges-François Frontec as Un homme

References

Bibliography 
 Goble, Alan. The Complete Index to Literary Sources in Film. Walter de Gruyter, 1999.

External links 
 

1951 films
1951 comedy films
French comedy films
1950s French-language films
Films directed by Pierre Billon
1950s French films